Founded in 1950, American Cinema Editors (ACE) is an honorary society of film editors that are voted in based on the qualities of professional achievements, their education of others, and their dedication to editing. Members use the post-nominal letters "ACE". The organization's "Eddie Awards" are routinely covered in trade magazines such as The Hollywood Reporter and Variety. The society is not an industry union, such as the I.A.T.S.E. (specifically the Motion Picture Editors Guild or MPEG), to which an editor might also belong. The current President of ACE is Kevin Tent, who was elected in 2020.

Membership
Eligibility for active membership may be obtained by the following prerequisites:

 Nomination or win of ACE Eddie award and/or
 Desire to be a member
 Sponsorship by at least two active members
 Minimum of 72 months' (6 years) editing experience on Features and/or Television
 Interview by the Membership Committee
 Approval by the Board of Directors
 Acceptance by the general membership

Members use the postnominal "ACE" as part of their signatures, as well as on motion picture credits. Thus the president of the society in October 2012 was Randy Roberts, ACE. Until 2014, the Acronym was separated by dots "A.C.E.", but this was dropped in order to conform with the more modern format used by many other industry organizations, such as ASC. The society publishes its current membership on its website.

Board of Directors
, the Board of Directors consists of:

Officers
 Kevin Tent (President)
 Sabrina Plisco (Vice President)
 Lillian Benson (Secretary)
 Andrew Seklir (Treasurer)

Board of Directors
 Kate Amend
 Anita Brandt-Burgoyne
 Richard Chew
 Dorian Harris
 Maysie Hoy
 Bonnie Koehler
 Michael D. Ornstein
 Tatiana S. Riegel
 Stephen Rivkin
 Terilyn A. Shropshire

Associate Board
 Dana E. Glauberman
 Mark Helfrich
 Nancy Richardson
 John Venzon

Executive Director
 Jenni McCormick

Eddie Awards
Beginning in 1950, the ACE held an annual dinner to honor the film editing Academy Award nominees. When the National Academy of Television Arts and Sciences (NATAS) created a film editing category, the ACE invited them to the dinner as well.

In 1962, the ACE began giving its own awards. The awards and nominations are typically covered in entertainment industry newspapers and journals such as Variety and The Hollywood Reporter.

The following awards are either currently given or have been given in the past. The American Cinema Editors does not publish an archive of these awards; it refers readers to the Internet Movie Database (IMDb) for archival information.

As of 2021, the ACE presents 16 categories for film and television alongside special ones, these have gone through several name changes to make distinctions between genre, running time and commercial/non-commercial television productions depending on the category. The list below shows the categories under their current names respectively.

Film
 Best Edited Animated Feature Film
 Best Edited Feature Film – Comedy or Musical
 Best Edited Feature Film – Dramatic
 Best Edited Documentary – Feature

Television
 Best Edited Comedy Series for Commercial Television
 Best Edited Comedy Series for Non-Commercial Television
 Best Edited Drama Series for Commercial Television
 Best Edited Drama Series for Non-Commercial Television
 Best Edited Documentary – (Non-Theatrical)
 Best Edited Miniseries or Motion Picture for Television
 Best Edited Non-Scripted Series
 Best Edited Variety Talk/Sketch Show or Special
 Best Edited Animation (Non-Theatrical)

Special Awards
 The ACE Student Editing Competition winner
 Career Achievement Awards
 The ACE Golden Eddie Filmmaker of the Year Award

Magazine

Since 1951, the ACE has published the quarterly magazine CinemaEditor. It began as an in-house publication, but grew to 5,000 subscribers in 1963. In the early 1990s the magazine collapsed into a four-page newsletter. In 1994, Jack Tucker was appointed as editor and transformed the publication into today's magazine. Walter Fernandez Jr. leads the magazine's team, with publications committee chair Edgar Burcksen.

ACE Student Editing Competition
The American Cinema Editors also holds an annual student competition, awarding one student editor for editing a set of video dailies for a dramatic scene. Three finalists are guests at the annual ACE Eddie Awards in February. Applications are accepted through October and cost US$125. The competition is limited to the first 100 students only.

Gunsmoke editing exercise
The ACE Store is the source of the dailies used at most film schools today, primarily for editing exercises. One scene that many film students must edit is from "Buffalo Man," a 1958 episode of the TV series Gunsmoke. The educational film with this footage is called Film Editing: Interpretation and Value, and is available only to instructors of film editing classes. The film includes three different edits of the Gunsmoke scene, as well as the scene's original dailies.

References

External links
 

 
American film awards
Entertainment industry societies
Film editing awards
Film organizations in the United States
Universal City, California
1950 establishments in the United States
Organizations established in 1950